The Steamship Owner (Italian: Il padrone del vapore) is a 1951 Italian comedy film directed by Mario Mattoli and starring Walter Chiari, Delia Scala and Carlo Campanini. The film's sets were designed by the art director Alberto Boccianti.

Plot
A rich American arrives in a little village in the mountains because he wants to advertise a drink he produces. In the village there are also two men from Rome who are at logger-heads with the locals. The coming of the American complicates matters.

Cast
 Walter Chiari as  Himself
 Delia Scala as  Herself
 Carlo Campanini as Mr. Carlo Peonio 
 Giovanna Pala as Trude 
 Mario Riva as Mario 
 Riccardo Billi as  Riccardo 
 Bice Valori as Marga 
 Aldo Giuffré as Nicola 
 Carlo Giuffré as Finanziere 
 Raffaele Pisu as Pino 
 Gianrico Tedeschi as  Pianista 
 Gisella Sofio as Coreografa 
 Alberto Sorrentino as Disegnatore 
 Aldo Bufi Landi as Finanziere napoletano 
 Anna Maestri as  Cameriera dell'albergo 
 Enzo Turco as  Sergente di finanza 
 Ciccio Barbi as  Alpino 
 Guglielmo Inglese as  Scenografo 
 Sofia Lazzaro as  Ballerinetta 
 Zoe Incrocci as  Donna furiosa 
 Giusi Raspani Dandolo as  Donna furiosa  
 Loris Gizzi as  Direttore Grand Hotel 
 Gianni Cavalieri as  Constantin 
 Ughetto Bertucci as  Peonio's Driver

References

Bibliography
 Aprà, Adriano. The Fabulous Thirties: Italian cinema 1929-1944. Electa International, 1979.
 Chiti, Roberto & Poppi, Roberto. Dizionario del cinema italiano: Dal 1945 al 1959. Gremese Editore, 1991.

External links

1951 films
1951 comedy films
1950s Italian-language films
Italian black-and-white films
Films directed by Mario Mattoli
Films produced by Carlo Ponti
Films produced by Dino De Laurentiis
Italian comedy films
1950s Italian films